Luanne Spadea-Nachmann (born December 28, 1972) is a former professional tennis player from the United States.

Biography
Spadea, who grew up in Boca Raton, Florida, is the elder sister of tennis player Vince Spadea. Her mother Hilda is Colombian and she is of Italian descent on her father's side.

While still a junior she began competing in WTA Tour main draws late in 1987, aged 14. In 1989, Spadea was the Orange Bowl (18 & Under) champion, her third Orange Bowl title, having earlier won the event in the 12s and 14s age divisions. She won her first ITF title in 1990 in Key Biscayne, an $25,000 event.

On the WTA Tour she was most successful as a doubles player, with a best doubles ranking of 98 in the world. She was a doubles finalist at São Paulo in 1990 partnering Mary Pierce and the following year made the singles quarter-finals of the same tournament. All of her grand slam main draw appearances were in women's doubles. 

After finishing up on tour in 1994 she played collegiate tennis for Duke University. She played alongside sister Diana while at Duke and in 1997 earned All-American honours.

Married to Marc Nachmann, Spadea lives in Florida with son Alec and daughter Elle, who are junior golfers.

WTA Tour finals

Doubles (0–1)

References

External links
 
 

1972 births
Living people
American female tennis players
Tennis people from Florida
Sportspeople from Boca Raton, Florida
American sportspeople of Colombian descent
American people of Italian descent
Duke Blue Devils women's tennis players